King George Street (Rehov ha-Melekh Jorj,  Shara'a al-Malik Jurj) is a street in central Jerusalem which joins the famous Ben Yehuda Street and Jaffa Road to form the Downtown Triangle central business district. The street was named in honour of King George V on December 9, 1924.

History
King George Street was dedicated in honour of the seventh anniversary of the British conquest of Jerusalem under General Allenby. The inauguration took place in 1924, in the presence of Sir Herbert Samuel, the High Commissioner for Palestine, Sir Ronald Storrs, the military governor of Jerusalem,  and Raghib al-Nashashibi, the Arab mayor of Jerusalem.

Jerusalem's first traffic light was installed at the intersection of King George Street and Jaffa Road. In 1950–1966, the Knesset, Israel's parliament, met at Beit Froumine on King George Street. It was used by Israel's first five governments, until the Knesset moved to a permanent building in Givat Ram.

Until the advent of the Jerusalem Light Rail, King George Street was one of two Jerusalem streets with a pedestrian scramble; the other is Kikar HaShabbat.

Landmarks
 Great Synagogue and Heichal Shlomo
 Jewish Agency for Israel
 Beit HaMa'alot ("elevator house"), 1935 highrise building with elevator, architects Alexander Friedman and Meir Rubin
 Beit Avi Chai culture centre
 The National Institutions House
 Independence Park
 Shiber Pit, the former Menorah Garden - the small park with the bronze horse statue at the junction with Ben Yehuda Street.

See also
 King George Street (Tel Aviv)
 Sbarro restaurant suicide bombing
 King George Street bombing

References

Gallery

Streets in Jerusalem
Downtown Triangle (Jerusalem)
George V